Babs (film)  is a 2000 Dutch film written and directed by Irma Achten, based on the story of Adam and Eve.

External links 
 

Dutch musical comedy films
2000 films
2000s Dutch-language films